Ilie Tudor (born 11 July 1924) is a Romanian fencer. He competed in three events at the 1952 Summer Olympics.

References

External links
 

1924 births
Possibly living people
Romanian male fencers
Romanian foil fencers
Romanian sabre fencers
Olympic fencers of Romania
Fencers at the 1952 Summer Olympics
Sportspeople from Bucharest